In European historiography, the term "staple" refers to the entire medieval system of trade and its taxation; its French equivalent is étape, and its German equivalent stapeln, words deriving from Late Latin  with the same meaning, derived from stabulum. designating a system that Hadrianus Junius considered to be of Gaulish origin.

Under this system, the government or the ruler required that all overseas trade in certain goods be transacted at specific designated market towns or ports, referred to as the "staple ports". The antiquary John Weever, quoting the 16th-century Tuscan merchant Lodovico Guicciardini, defined a staple town "to be a place, to which by the prince's authority and privilege wool, hides of beasts, wine, corn or grain, and other exotic or foreign merchandize are transferred, carried or conveyed to be sold". At these specified privileged places, which were invariably towns, accredited merchants, later to become organized in England as Merchants of the Staple, were required to submit their goods to inspection. In England they were obliged to pay a levy to the Crown on goods for export to the continent of Europe. The system made it easy for local and regional governments to monitor the overseas trade and to levy taxes and derive income and revenue from it.

Scotland
In the 15th century, Bruges was the Scottish staple port. As the harbour at Bruges silted up, the focus of Scots trade moved north to the Dutch ports of Middleburg and Veere, with Veere gaining staple status in 1541. There is some evidence of Dordrecht being used in 1670.

England
Under the Staple, the designated port was often overseas. It was at Dordrecht in 1338, and at Bruges in 1343. For a time after 1353, staple ports were established in England, under the Statute of the Staple: thus various English localities named "Stapleton" or "Stapleford". 

However, from 1363, Calais was designated the staple port for wool and leather exports. All wool sold overseas was taken first to Calais, then under English control. Under this system, Calais itself was called "the Staple". The trade was dominated by the Merchants of the Staple who, from 1363, had been granted the exclusive right to trade raw wool in Calais.

The English system remained in place for nearly two centuries, though it would decline in importance as exports of finished cloth were substituted for exports of raw wool. With the fall of Calais to the French, in 1558, the staple moved again to Bruges. From 1617, wool exports were stopped entirely, and only domestic staples would remain in England.

See also
 
 Amsterdam Entrepôt (Amsterdam stapelmarkt)
 Merchants of the Staple
 Statute of the Staple
 Staple right

References

External links
 The origin, the organisation and the location of The Staple of England
Finance and trade under Edward III - The estate of merchants, 1336-1365, IV - 1355-65

Medieval economics
Medieval law
Economic history of England